Novosovkhozny is a rural locality (a passing loop) in Tabunsky Selsoviet, Tabunsky District, Altai Krai, Russia. The population was 3 as of 2013.

References 

Rural localities in Tabunsky District